The Special Weapons And Tactics (SWAT) is the police tactical unit of the Dhaka Metropolitan Police of the Bangladesh Police. They operate under Special Action Group of the Counter Terrorism and Transnational Crime. The SWAT was formed to recover illegal arms and arrest hardcore terrorists and has a vital role in neutralizing any and all threats.

The SWAT has been regularly deployed outside of Dhaka to respond to terrorist incidents. The Bangladesh Police plans to establish anti-terrorism operational units similar to SWAT in all of the Metropolitan Police. A Crisis Response Team (CRT) has been established in Chittagong, Sylhet and in Rajshahi that were trained in the United States and in Jordan.

History

The SWAT was established on 28 February 2009 as part of the Detective Branch of the Dhaka Metropolitan Police under the control of the Dhaka Metropolitan Police Commissioner. The SWAT was to be ready for deployments on 1 March of that year in Dhaka and even outside if required. The SWAT was to be more powerful than the Bangladesh Police Rapid Action Battalion (RAB) and could be deployed to deal with terrorist groups and any criminals.

The SWAT completed a 45-day training program conducted by nine United States experts from the Army, Federal Bureau of Investigation (FBI) and Police which was financed by the United States. The United States also provided equipment including M4 carbines, SR-25/AR-10 sniper rifles and Glock 17 pistols.

In 2016, the SWAT was placed under the command of the newly formed Counter Terrorism and Transnational Crime. In the same year, the SWAT had 50 members, with 20 new recruits to receive training in the United States with the SWAT aiming to expand to the unit to 100 members.

In 2017, the United States Bureau of Diplomatic Security Anti-terrorism Assistance Program (ATA) trained nine SWAT instructors over 7 weeks who conducted two refresher Crisis Response Team courses for 42 SWAT members.

Operations

The SWAT was deployed for security during the 2008 Bangladeshi general election, Pahela Baishakh and at Shaheed Minar during celebrations for International Mother Language Day.

The SWAT has deployed to many militant attacks, including outside of Dhaka in 2017 to Chapainawabganj for Operation "Eagle Hunt" and to Chapainawabganj for Operation "Hit Back". In July 2016, the SWAT responded to the Holey Artisan Bakery terrorist attack in Gulshan Thana with eight SWAT members seriously injured.

See also
Airport Armed Police Crisis Response Team (CRT)

References

Non-military counterterrorist organizations
Law enforcement in Bangladesh